Shunde Port is a passenger port in Shunde, Foshan, Guangdong, China. It is located at the right side of Wusha Bridge in Daliang, Shunde. It provides daily passenger vessel service between Shunde and Hong Kong.

The port started service in 1998 when the passenger port of the nearby Rongqi Port was relocated there.

References

Ports and harbours of China
Shunde District